This is a working list of notable faculty, alumni and scholars of the University of Pennsylvania in Philadelphia, United States.

Faculty

Academia

Penn alumni are the (a) founders of a number of colleges, as well as eight medical schools including New York University Medical School and Vanderbilt University School of Medicine, and (b) current or past presidents of over one hundred (100) universities and colleges including Harvard University, University of Pennsylvania, Princeton University, Cornell University, University of California system, University of Texas system, Carnegie Mellon University, Northwestern University, Bowdoin College and Williams College.

Arts, media, and entertainment

Athletics

College football Hall of Famers

Head coaches

NFL champions 
Chuck Bednarik (Class of 1949): Philadelphia Eagles linebacker and 1960 NFL champion; member of the Pro Football Hall of Fame and College Football Hall of Fame; namesake of the Chuck Bednarik Award in college football; recipient of the 2010 Walter Camp Distinguished American Award
George Washington Tuffy Conn (February 22, 1892 – August 2, 1973) Class of 1920: was a professional American football player who played in 1920 for the Cleveland Tigers and the Akron Pros of the American Professional Football Association (renamed the National Football League in 1922) and won the first AFPA-NFL title that season with the Pros
Jim Finn (Class of 1999): NFL fullback and New York Giants Super Bowl XLII Champion
Ernest Alexander Tex Hamer (October 4, 1901 – May 9, 1981) Class of 1923: 1926 NFL Champion playing for Frankford Yellow Jackets
Walter Irving Pard Pearce - October 23, 1896 – May 24, 1974 (Class of 1920); won 1921 NFL Championship playing for the Chicago Staleys (now the Chicago Bears)
Carroll Rosenbloom (Class of 1928) a two-year letterman as a halfback on the Penn football team in 1927 and 1928 who was the owner of two National Football League franchises (1)  the Baltimore Colts, and (2) the Los Angeles Rams; where his franchises, amassed the best ownership winning percentage in NFL history (.660) (with a total regular season record of 226 wins, 116 losses, and 8 ties) and won 3 NFL championships (1958, 1959, 1968), and one Super Bowl (V) 
Justin Watson (Class of 2018): NFL wide receiver and Tampa Bay Buccaneers Super Bowl LV and Kansas City Chiefs Super Bowl LVII Champion

Olympic medalists 
The university currently holds the record (21) for most medals won by its alumni at any single Olympic Games (1900 Summer Olympic Games) and at least 43 different alumni have earned Olympic medals as detailed below.

Sports executives and owners

Professional basketball players 

 Ernie Beck, class of 1953; selected by Philadelphia Warriors as the 2nd overall pick in the 1953 National Basketball Association draft (winning NBA championship in 1956), played for the St. Louis Hawks (now Atlanta Hawks), and Syracuse Nationals (now known as Philadelphia 76ers)
Corky Calhoun, Class of 1972, was selected by Phoenix Suns as the 4th overall pick in the 1972 NBA Draft, played for four teams in nine seasons and won NBA championship title with the Portland Trail Blazers in 1977
"Chink" Francis Crossin (July 4, 1923 – January 10, 1981), Class of 1947, was selected by Philadelphia Warriors as the 6th overall pick in the 1947 Basketball Association of America (which a few years later merged into another professional league) Draft, played for the Warriors for three years and averaged a career-high 7.0 points per game in 1949–50, named EBA Most Valuable Player in 1952
Matt Maloney, Class of 1995, was not selected in the 1995 NBA draft but signed with the Houston Rockets, played six NBA seasons with the Houston Rockets, Atlanta Hawks, and Chicago Bulls and, in 1997, was named to the NBA All-Rookie Second Team
Bob Morse: class of 1972; played in Europe, named in 2008 as one of the 50 most influential personalities in European club basketball played for Italian League club Pallacanestro Varese, also led the Italian League in scoring during six seasons
Tony Price, class of 1979; selected by the Detroit Pistons as the overall 29th pick in the second round of the 1979 NBA Draft, played five games for the San Diego Clippers
Zack Rosen: All-American basketball player, class of 2012; played professional basketball with Hapoel Holon, Hapoel Jerusalem B.C., and Maccabi Ashdod B.C., each of which are part of the Israeli Basketball Super League, and won the 3-point shootout in the Israeli Super League All Star Game in 2014 and 2015
Jerry Simon: basketball player, class of 1990, American-Israeli, who after being captain of Penn basketball team played professional basketball in Israel for three teams in the Israeli Basketball Premier League, and for the Israel men's national basketball team
Matthew White: basketball player, class of 1979, selected by Portland Trail Blazers, played professionally in the Liga ACB for several teams

Other athletes

Business
For a more comprehensive list of notable alumni in the business world, see Wharton School of the University of Pennsylvania. (Note: Not all of the following individuals attended the Wharton School, but may be alumni of other schools within the University of Pennsylvania).

Company founders 

 William Bingham, Class of 1768, a founder and director of the Bank of North America, the first modern United States bank
 John Bogle: founder and retired CEO of The Vanguard Group
 Richard Bloch (Class of 1942): co-founder, H&R Block
Len Bosack: co-founder, Cisco Systems (Internet router company)
David J. Brown: co-founder of Silicon Graphics
Warren Buffett: CEO of Berkshire Hathaway, investor, the second richest man in the world (attended for two years before transferring to the University of Nebraska)
Jonathan Brassington : CEO and co-founder LiquidHub. 
William P. Carey: founder of W. P. Carey & Co. LLC, a corporate real estate financing firm headquartered in New York City
Steven A. Cohen: founder and Manager, SAC Capital Partners and Point72 Asset Management
Catherine Austin Fitts: CEO and founder of Solari Inc., former United States Assistant Secretary of Housing and Urban Development for Housing 
Geraldine Laybourne: founder of Oxygen Media
John Grayken: founder and chairman of Lone Star Funds
James Dinan: hedge fund manager and founder of York Capital Management
Sam Hamadeh: founder, Vault Inc. and film producer
Brad Handler: co-founder and chairman of Inspirato; first in-house attorney at eBay
Gilbert W. Harrison, founder, chairman and CEO, Financo, Inc.
Vernon Hill: founder, chairman, and CEO, Commerce Bancorp
Jon Huntsman Sr.: billionaire, founder of the Huntsman Corporation
Josh Kopelman: founder, Half.com
Douglas Lenat: founder of artificial intelligence company Cycorp
Ronald Li: founder and past chairman of the Hong Kong Stock Exchange
Ken Moelis: founder of Moelis & Company
Elon Musk: technology entrepreneur; founder, CEO and CTO of SpaceX; co-founder of PayPal; board member of Planetary Society; investor and chairman of the board of Tesla Motors
Peter Nicholas: billionaire co-founder of the medical device firm Boston Scientific
William Novelli: CEO of AARP; founder and past president of Porter Novelli, one of the world's largest lobbying and public relations firms, now part of the Omnicom Group
William S. Paley: founder, CBS Corporation
Stephen M. Peck: investor and philanthropist, co-founder of Weiss, Peck & Greer
Mark Pincus: co-founder of Zynga (class of 1988)
J.D. Power III: founder of marketing research firm J.D. Power & Associates
Raj Rajaratnam: billionaire founder of the hedge fund Galleon Group
Josh Resnick: founder and President, Pandemic Studios
Ralph J. Roberts: co-founder, Comcast Corporation
Michael Tiemann: co-founder of Cygnus Solutions (a GNU software company), now CTO of Red Hat
Edward Rosenthal: founder of Riverside Memorial Chapel
Henry Salvatori: founder, Western Geophysical; founding stockholder of the National Review magazine
Harry Scherman: co-founder of the Book of the Month Club
Tanya Seaman: co-founder of PhillyCarShare
Joseph Segel: founder, QVC; founder, Franklin Mint
Brian Sheth: co-founder and President of Vista Equity Partners
Gregg Spiridellis: founder, JibJab Media, Inc.
Michael Steinhardt: co-founder of hedge fund Steinhardt, Fine, Berkowitz & Co.; philanthropist

Other entrepreneurs and business leaders 
Laura J. Alber: president and CEO of Williams-Sonoma, Inc.
Anil Ambani: billionaire, chairman, Anil Dhirubhai Ambani Group
Walter Annenberg: billionaire publisher; philanthropist; former U.S Ambassador to the United Kingdom; awarded the Presidential Medal of Freedom; given the rank of Knight Commander (the second-highest rank in the Order of the British Empire) by Queen Elizabeth II
Susan Arnold: former vice chairman of Procter & Gamble
Morton J. Baum: president of Hickey Freeman
Nariman Behravesh (born 1948): economist
Alfred Berkeley: former president and vice-chairman of the NASDAQ Stock Market, Inc.
Nicholas Biddle: president of the Second Bank of the United States
Norman Blackwell, Baron Blackwell: chairman of Interserve and Lloyds Banking Group
Matt Blank: chairman and CEO of Showtime
Mitchell Blutt: Executive Partner, J.P. Morgan Chase
Dimitri Boylan: former CEO of Hotjobs.com, now part of Yahoo!
Christopher Browne: past managing director of Tweedy, Browne Co.
Charles Butt: billionaire, CEO and chairman, H-E-B Grocery Company
Robert Castellini: CEO and part-owner of the Cincinnati Reds baseball team
Arthur D. Collins Jr.: chairman and CEO, Medtronic
Stephen Cooper: CEO of Warner Music Group
Robert Crandall: chairman and CEO, American Airlines, Inc
Donny Deutsch: chairman, Deutsch, Inc.
Michael DiCandilo: Chief Financial Officer and Executive Vice President of AmerisourceBergen corporation
Alexis Irénée du Pont Jr.: business executive for DuPont
Eugene du Pont: first head of modern-day DuPont
Mike Eskew: chairman and CEO, UPS
Alexander C. Feldman: president, US-ASEAN Business Council; former Assistant Secretary of State
Jay S. Fishman: chairman and CEO of The Travelers Companies
Russell P. Fradin: chairman and CEO of Hewitt Associates
Robert B. Goergen: chairman and CEO of Blyth, Inc.
Steven Goldstone: former chairman and CEO of RJR Nabisco
Joel Greenblatt: hedge fund manager and author
George H. Heilmeier: former president and CEO of Bellcore (now Telcordia)
Charles A. Heimbold, Jr.: U.S. Ambassador to Sweden, former chairman and CEO of Bristol-Myers Squibb Company
C. Robert Henrikson: chairman, president and CEO, MetLife
Philip B. Hofmann: past chairman and CEO of Johnson & Johnson
Jirair Hovnanian: home builder
John Carmichael Jenkins: planter and proponent of slavery in the Antebellum South
Reginald H. Jones: former chairman and CEO of General Electric
Yotaro Kobayashi: chairman and co-CEO, Fuji Xerox
Kong Dongmei: Chinese entrepreneur 
Leonard Lauder: chairman and CEO of Estée Lauder; billionaire investor
Terry Leahy: CEO, Tesco
Gerald Levin: former CEO of AOL Time Warner
Edward J. Lewis: former chairman of the board of the Oxford Development Company, one of the largest Pennsylvania-based real estate firms
George Lindemann: billionaire industrialist
Joseph Wharton Lippincott: past president and chairman of the board of J. B. Lippincott Company, and grandson of industrialist Joseph Wharton, founder of the Wharton School of Business
Robert Litzenberger: partner, Goldman Sachs
Betty Liu: executive vice chairman of the New York Stock Exchange
John A. Luke Jr.: chairman and chief executive officer of MeadWestvaco Corporation
Peter Lynch: investor; vice chairman of Fidelity Investments
Harold McGraw III: president and CEO of McGraw-Hill Companies and chairman of the Business Roundtable
Michael Milken: trader, financier, felon
Bill Miller: chairman and chief investment officer, Legg Mason Capital Management
Jordan Mintz: Enron whistleblower
Aditya Mittal: president and CFO, Mittal Steel Company
Michael Moritz: venture capitalist, Sequoia Capital
Michael H. Moskow: 8th President and CEO of the Federal Reserve Bank of Chicago
Phebe Novakovic: chairman and CEO of General Dynamics
Bruce Pasternack: president and CEO of the Special Olympics International; former Senior Vice President of Booz Allen Hamilton Inc.
Ronald O. Perelman: billionaire investor
Benjamin W. Perkins Jr.: Thoroughbred racehorse trainer
Douglas L. Peterson: CEO of McGraw Hill Financial
Lionel Pincus: past chairman of Warburg Pincus
Lewis E. Platt: president, CEO and chairman of the board of Hewlett-Packard
Edmund T. Pratt Jr.: former chairman and CEO of Pfizer, Inc.
Frank Quattrone: prominent investment banker, formerly with Credit Suisse First Boston
Robert Rabinovitch: former president and CEO of the Canadian Broadcasting Corporation
Sylvia Rhone: former president and CEO of Eastwest Records, Elektra Records, and Motown Records; first African-American woman to head a major record company
Rich Riley: CEO, Shazam; former Senior Vice President and Managing Director of Yahoo! Europe, Middle East & Africa
James O. Robbins: president and CEO of Cox Communications
Brian L. Roberts: chairman and CEO, Comcast Corporation
Lucille Roberts University of Pennsylvania (College for Women, Class of 1964): namesake and proprietor of women's fitness clubs
Eileen Clarkin Rominger: Goldman Sachs partner
Frank Rooney: past CEO of Melville Corporation
Harold Rosen: Executive Director of the Grassroots Business Fund
Arthur Ross: businessman and philanthropist
Perry Rotella: senior vice president and CIO of Verisk Analytics
J. Brendan Ryan: chairman of Foote, Cone, and Belding
Charles S. Sanford Jr.: CEO of Bankers Trust
Alan D. Schnitzer: CEO of the Travelers Companies
John Sculley: former president of PepsiCo; former CEO of Apple Computer
Paul V. Scura: former Executive Vice President and Head of the Investment Bank of Prudential Securities
Mike Sievert:Wharton School of the University of Pennsylvania (Class of 1991): CEO of T-Mobile US
Henry Silverman: COO of the Apollo Group, formerly head of Cendant Corporation
Young Sohn:  president and Chief Strategy Officer of Samsung Electronics
Richard Stearns: president of World Vision
Patrick J. Talamantes: CEO of McClatchy Company
James S. Tisch: CEO, Loews Corporation
Laurence Tisch: former CEO of CBS
Roy Vagelos: former CEO of Merck
James L. Vincent: past president and CEO of Biogen Idec
George Herbert Walker IV: College and Undergraduate Class of 1991 and Wharton School of the University of Pennsylvania Graduate School Class of 1992, graduated Phi Beta Kappa and received a dual degree – a B.S. and a B.A., both  and received an MBA as a Palmer Scholar after completing the 5 year MBA program; received the Harry S. Truman Scholarship was a member of the St. Anthony Hall fraternity; CEO of Neuberger Berman; former managing director of Lehman Brothers; formerly a Partner with Goldman Sachs & Co; Co-President, Commodities Corporation and was a Benjamin Franklin Scholar, graduated Phi Beta Kappa and received a dual degree – a B.S. and a B.A., both . He also received his MBA as a Palmer Scholar from the Wharton School of the University of Pennsylvania after completing the 5 year MBA program. He was a member of the St. Anthony Hall fraternity.
Jacob Wallenberg: chairman, Investor
Jeff Weiner: CEO of LinkedIn
Dawne Williams: former CEO of St. Kitts-Nevis-Anguilla National Bank.
Joseph P. Williams: creator of the first all-purpose bank credit card, BankAmericard, now known as the Visa, Inc. card
Gary L. Wilson: CEO and chairman, Northwest Airlines
William Wrigley Jr. II: chairman and former CEO of the Wm. Wrigley Jr. Company, makers of chewing gum and confectionery products
Steve Wynn: chairman and CEO Wynn Resorts; former chairman and CEO Mirage Resorts, Inc.; responsible for the renaissance of Las Vegas
Morrie Yohai: co-creator of Cheez Doodles snack food
Mark Zandi: economist
Mortimer Zuckerman: real estate billionaire; publisher/owner of the New York Daily News; editor-in-chief of U.S. News & World Report
Martin Zweig: stock investor and author

Exploration
Robert Adams Jr.: Penn graduate; served as a botanist with Penn professor Ferdinand Vandeveer Hayden while exploring the northwest corner of Wyoming; their efforts led directly to the founding of Yellowstone National Park, the first national park in the United States
Peter Custis, Class of 1807: a leader of the Red River Expedition in 1806, the first civilian scientific expedition to explore the American West
Michael L. Gernhardt: (Penn Engineering Class of 1983 (Masters) and 1991 (Ph.D.) in Bioengineering) NASA astronaut
Charles Guillou: member of the 19th-century United States Exploring Expedition
Isaac Israel Hayes: 19th-century Arctic explorer; Heiss Island in Franz Josef Land (Russia) was named in his honor
Elisha Kane: Arctic explorer who received medals from the United States Congress, the Royal Geographical Society, and the Société de Géographie for his work; namesake of the naval destroyer 
Garrett Reisman: (Penn Class of 1991) dual bachelor degrees from  Wharton and Engineering schools via the Jerome Fisher Program in Management and Technology  NASA Space Shuttle astronaut
B. Clark Wheeler: founder of Aspen, Colorado

Government, politics, and law

Colonial American leaders

Members of the Continental Congress

Signers of the US Constitution and/or Declaration of Independence 
Sources: University of Pennsylvania Archives

 George Clymer: Penn Trustee 1779–1813; an elected member of the Continental Congress who was one of only six people who signed the Declaration of Independence and signed (for Pennsylvania) US Constitution
 Thomas FitzSimons, Penn Trustee 1789–1811: signed (for Pennsylvania) US Constitution
 Benjamin Franklin, Penn founder and Trustee 1749–1790: was one of only six people who signed the Declaration of Independence and signed (for Pennsylvania) US Constitution
 Francis Hopkinson, Penn degrees A.B. 1757; A.M. 1760; LL.D. 1790; Penn Trustee 1787–1791: signed the Declaration of Independence
 Jared Ingersoll, Penn Trustee 1778–1791: signed the US Constitution 
 Robert Morris, Penn Trustee 1778–1791: one of only six people who signed the Declaration of Independence and signed (for Pennsylvania) US Constitution 
 Thomas McKean, Penn degrees: A.M. (hon.) 1763 and LL.D. 1785; Penn Trustee 1779–1817; president of Penn Board of Trustees: signed the Declaration of Independence
 William Paca, Penn degrees: A.B. 1759 and A.M. 1762; Penn Trustee; Maryland delegate to the Continental Congress, 1774–79; signed the Declaration of Independence; Chief Justice of Maryland (1788–1790)
 Benjamin Rush, Penn Med class of 1766; Penn Med professor 1769–1813; signed the Declaration of Independence
 Hugh Williamson, Penn degrees: A.B. 1757, A.M. 1760, and LL.D. (hon.) 1787; tutor 1755–1758; Penn professor of mathematics 1761–1763: North Carolina delegate to the Continental Congress, signed US Constitution; representative to US Congress
 James Wilson, Penn degrees A.M. (hon.) 1766 and LL.D. 1790; Penn Trustee; delegate to Continental Congress; signed the Declaration of Independence and signed (for Pennsylvania) US Constitution, the first draft of which he wrote; US Supreme Court justice

US government

Presidents of the United States 
William Henry Harrison, Penn Med class of 1791 but did not graduate: 9th president of the United States
Donald J. Trump, Wharton School of Finance class of 1968: 45th president of the United States

Members of the United States Cabinet (or top level executive branch)

US senators 
, 32 Penn alumni have served as senators from 16 different states as detailed below:

Members of the US House of Representatives 
As of May 2020, 163 Representatives from 21 different states have been affiliated with Penn

US Supreme Court Justices 
William J. Brennan: US Supreme Court justice; recipient of the Presidential Medal of Freedom
Owen J. Roberts: US Supreme Court justice

US ambassadors 
, Penn alumni have served as ambassadors to at least 51 different countries.

State government

Governors 
As of May 2020, 46 Penn alumni have served as governors of 24 different states, Puerto Rico and American Samoa.

State legislators 
At least 52 Penn alumni have served in state legislatures in at least 18 states (at least five of whom have served as speaker of their respective houses of representatives (in Maine, New Jersey, Oregon, and Pennsylvania) and one of whom served as President of state Senate (in New Jersey)).

Robert Adams Jr. (February 26, 1849 – June 1, 1906) - University of Pennsylvania (Class of 1869) where he was a member of St. Anthony Hall fraternity: a Republican member of the Pennsylvania State Senate for the 6th district from 1883 to 1885(who also served as a member of the U.S. House of Representatives for Pennsylvania's 2nd congressional district from 1893 to 1906 and served as the Envoy Extraordinary and Minister Plenipotentiary to Brazil from April 1, 1889, through June 1, 1890)
 Harry W. Bass, (Penn Law Class of 1896) first African American member of the Pennsylvania House of Representatives, 1911–1914
Jennifer Beck: (University of Pennsylvania Fels Institute of Government, MGA) Republican Party politician who served in the New Jersey State Senate representing the 11th Legislative District from 2012 to 2018 and prior to redistricting,  served in the Senate from 2008 to 2012 representing the 12th Legislative District, serving portions of Monmouth and Mercer counties, and represented the 12th District in the New Jersey General Assembly from 2006 to 2008
William Bingham:  (March 8, 1752 – February 7, 1804) first Speaker of the Pennsylvania House of Representatives
Louis A. Bloom: Republican member of the Pennsylvania House of Representatives for Delaware County (1947–1952) and Judge Pennsylvania Court of Common Pleas for Delaware County
Karen Boback: Republican member of the Pennsylvania House of Representatives (2007– )
Stacy Brenner: Democratic member of the Maine State Senate (2020-)
John F. Byrne, Jr.: Pennsylvania State Senator for the 6th district (1967–1970)
Martha Hughes Cannon, BS, MD, Penn Med post doc education Class of 1882; Penn College Class of 1882: Utah State Senator; first female state senator elected in the United States
Robert J. Clendening: Republican member of the Pennsylvania House of Representatives (1949–1952)
Herbert B. Cohen (July 2, 1900 – December 2, 1970) Wharton (Class of 1922) and University of Pennsylvania Law School (Class of 1925) served as (a) Democratic member of the Pennsylvania House of Representatives for four consecutive terms, 1933–40, twice as Majority leader, once as Minority leader, (b) Attorney General of Pennsylvania from 1955 through 1956 and (c) Justice of the Pennsylvania Supreme Court from 1957 through 1970
Mark B. Cohen: Democratic member of the Pennsylvania House of Representatives
Eckley Brinton Coxe: Pennsylvania State Senator for the 21st district from 1881 to 1884
Jean B. Cryor: former Maryland Delegate
Glenn Cummings: Democratic member of the Maine House of Representatives, including one term as Speaker of the House (2000–2008)
John Warren Davis: former member of the New Jersey State Senate; United States Attorney for the District of New Jersey;  judge for the United States District Court for the District of New Jersey and United States Court of Appeals for the Third Circuit
Dan Debicella: member of the Connecticut Senate
William K. Dickey: Speaker of the New Jersey General Assembly and chairman of the Delaware River Port Authority
Marie Donigan (Penn School of Design, MS in Landscape Architecture): Democratic member of the Michigan State House of Representatives (2004–2011)
David Frockt: (born July 14, 1969) University of Pennsylvania, B.A. in Political Science (Class of 1991): first elected to the Washington State House of Representatives in 2010 and in 2011, after the death of Senator Scott White, the Metropolitan King County Council voted unanimously to appointed for the 46th legislative district of Washington State Senate, which includes North Seattle, Lake Forest Park, and Kenmore Washington State Senate and in 2012 was retained by voters to serve the remaining two years of the open Senate term and in 2014 was re-elected to a full term in the State Senate, where he is a member on the Ways & Means, Law & Justice, and Human Services committees
Michael F. Gerber: Democratic member of the Pennsylvania House of Representatives
Michael U. Gisriel: former member of the Maryland House of Delegates
Stewart Greenleaf: Republican member of the Pennsylvania State Senate (1978– )
 Bernard Gross (born May 22, 1935) Wharton School of Finance Class of 1956 and Penn Law Class of 1959; lawyer elected twice as Democratic member of the Pennsylvania House of Representatives from the 200th district for years 1967–1970
John J. Hafer: former Maryland State Senator
Phil Hart: Republican member of the Idaho House of Representatives (2004– )
Charlie Brady Hauser: member of the North Carolina General Assembly
Jon Hinck: member of the Maine House of Representatives (2006– )
Constance N. Johnson: Democratic member of the Oklahoma State Senate (2005–2014); United States Senate Democratic nominee of Oklahoma (2014)
Eric Johnson: Democratic member of the Texas House of Representatives (2010– )
Movita Johnson-Harrell: Democratic member of the Pennsylvania House of Representatives (2019– )
Tony Jordan: member of the New York State Assembly (2009– )
Steve Katz: member of the New York State Assembly and Candidate for New York State Senate
John Manners: president of the New Jersey Senate (1852)
John Hartwell Marable: University of Pennsylvania School of Medicine (Class of 1814) but with no record of graduation; member of the Tennessee Senate (1817–18)
Bruce Marks: Republican member of the Pennsylvania 2nd senatorial district 1994 to 1995
Charles B. Moores: University of Pennsylvania Law School (Class of 1874) Speaker of the Oregon House of Representatives (1895–96)
Raj Mukherji: Assemblyman of the New Jersey State Legislature
Jennifer O'Mara  (Penn Graduate School of Arts & Sciences, Class of 2017) represents the 165th Legislative District, which includes parts of Springfield Township, Marple Township, Radnor Township and the borough of Morton.
Joseph J. Roberts: former Speaker and Assemblyman of the New Jersey State Legislature
Richard Peters Jr., Class of 1761: Pennsylvania delegate to the Continental Congress, 1782–83; Commissioner for the Board of War for the Continental Army; Speaker of the Pennsylvania House of Representatives; served in the Pennsylvania Senate; appointed as judge of the U.S. District Court for the Eastern District of Pennsylvania (1815–1828)
James N. Robertson: Republican member of the Pennsylvania House of Representative (1949–1952)
Vaughn Stewart: Democratic member of the Maryland House of Delegates (2019– )
David W. Sweet: Democratic member of the Pennsylvania House of Representatives (1978–88)
Chris Taylor: Democratic member of the Wisconsin State Assembly (2011– )
Eric Turkington: Democratic member of the Massachusetts House of Representatives
Charles R. Weiner: Democratic Leader of the Pennsylvania Senate
"Buck" Charles Wharton (1868 – November 15, 1949) Wharton School of Finance Class of 1897: selected as an All-American guard in 1896 and also played on Penn teams that were undefeated and won back-to-back national championships in 1894 and 1895; served as Delaware State Senator from 1914 to 1917; in 1963, was posthumously inducted into the College Football Hall of Fame
Constance H. Williams: Democratic member of the Pennsylvania State Senate 
Robert C. Wonderling: Republican member of the Pennsylvania State Senate
Bob Ziegelbauer: Democratic Party member of the Wisconsin State Assembly

Mayors

State Supreme Court justices
As of February of 2023, twenty-seven (27) Penn alumni have served as justices of supreme courts of ten (10) different states and the District of Columbia, and eleven (11) have served as chief justices of a state supreme court.

 William Allen, a founder of Pennsylvania Hospital and trustee of University of Pennsylvania, funded the state house (Independence Hall), served as Mayor of Philadelphia, appointed judge of the Orphans’ and Common Pleas courts of Philadelphia and Chief Justice of the Supreme Court of Pennsylvania
 Rachel Wainer Apter, College Class of 2002, New Jersey Supreme Court Associate Justice who was confirmed by New Jersey Senate on October 17, 2022, and was sworn into office on October 21, 2022
John C. Bell Jr. (October 25, 1892 – March 18, 1974), Class of 1917, was a justice of the Pennsylvania Supreme Court (1950–1972), and Chief Justice of the Pennsylvania Supreme Court (1961–1972)
William J. Brennan: justice of the New Jersey Supreme Court (1951–56) (later Justice of the United States Supreme Court)
William Bradford: justice of the Pennsylvania Supreme Court (1791–94), and Attorney General of Pennsylvania (1780–91); attended Penn for three years before graduating from Princeton University
Elissa F. Cadish (College Class of 1986): Justice Nevada Supreme Court (2019- )
Joseph M. Carey: Attorney General of Wyoming (1869–71); justice, Wyoming Supreme Court (1871–1876)
Herbert B. Cohen (July 2, 1900 – December 2, 1970) Wharton (Class of 1922) and University of Pennsylvania Law School (Class of 1925) served as (a) Representative of Pennsylvania State House of Representatives for four consecutive terms, 1933–40, twice as Majority leader, once as Minority leader, (b) Attorney General of Pennsylvania from 1955 through 1956 and (c) Justice of the Pennsylvania Supreme Court from 1957 through 1970
James Harry Covington: Chief Justice of the Supreme Court of the District of Columbia (1914–18)
Lucius Elmer: former justice of the New Jersey Supreme Court and Attorney General of New Jersey
Arthur J. England Jr.: Chief Justice of the Florida Supreme Court (1978–80)
Richard L. Gabriel, Penn Law Class of 1987, (born March 3, 1962) was appointed in 2015 (and continues to serve after being retained in 2018) as an Associate Justice of the Colorado Supreme Court. Justice Gabriel previously served on the Colorado Court of Appeals from 2008 to 2015
Randy J. Holland, justice of the Delaware Supreme Court (1986–2017)
Daniel J. Layton: Chief Justice of the Delaware Supreme Court (1933–45), and Attorney General of Delaware (1932–33)
Robert N. C. Nix Jr.: former chief justice of the Pennsylvania Supreme Court (1984–1996), he was the first African-American Chief Justice of any state's highest court; justice of the Pennsylvania Supreme Court (1971–1984)
Joseph B. Perskie (1885–1957; class of 1907), associate justice of the New Jersey Supreme Court from 1933 to 1947.
Deborah T. Poritz, Chief Justice of the New Jersey Supreme Court (1996–2006)(and previously was the Attorney General of New Jersey from 1994 to 1996, in both cases becoming the first woman to serve in that position
Mark Rindner (College Class of 1971, Graduate School of Education Class of 1971): justice of Alaska Supreme Court
Albert Rosenblatt: judge on the New York Court of Appeals, the highest court in New York state (1998–2006)
George Sharswood: former chief justice of the Pennsylvania Supreme Court, and Dean of the University of Pennsylvania School of Law
Thomas Smith: (University of Pennsylvania Medical School (Class of 1829) Justice of the Indiana Supreme Court (January 29, 1847 through January 3, 1853)
Horace Stern (Penn Law Class of 1890): Chief Justice of the Pennsylvania Supreme Court (1952–56) and Justice of Pennsylvania Supreme Court (1932–1952)
Leo E. Strine Jr. (Penn Law Class of 1988): Chief Justice of Delaware Supreme Court (2014–2019) and judge and vice-chancellor of the Delaware Court of Chancery
Richard B. Teitelman: Chief Justice of the Missouri Supreme Court (2011–13)
William Tilghman: Chief Justice of the Pennsylvania Supreme Court (1805–27); attended Penn but did not earn a degree
Jasper Yeates (College Class of 1758), was a delegate to the Pennsylvania convention that ratified the United States Constitution in 1787, appointed as a justice of the Pennsylvania Supreme Court in 1791, served until his death in 1817.
Karen L. Valihura (Penn Law Class of 1986)  Justice of the Delaware Supreme Court (appointed June 6, 2014)

U.S. federal judges 

 Arlin Adams, judge, United States Court of Appeals for the Third Circuit 1969–1987
 Guy K. Bard, judge, United States District Court for the Eastern District of Pennsylvania
 Harvey Bartle III, judge, United States District Court for the Eastern District of Pennsylvania
 Michael Baylson, judge, United States District Court for the Eastern District of Pennsylvania
Edward R. Becker: former chief judge of the United States Court of Appeals for the Third Circuit
 Ralph C. Body, judge, United States District Court for the Eastern District of Pennsylvania, 1965–1973
 Raymond J. Broderick, judge, United States District Court for the Eastern District of Pennsylvania
 Margo Kitsy Brodie, judge, United States District Court for the Eastern District of New York
 Allison Dale Burroughs, Penn Law Class of 1988 (born April 25, 1961), is a United States district judge of the United States District Court for the District of Massachusetts who received her federal judicial commission on December 19, 2014, and was sworn in on January 7, 2015. Judge Burroughs began her legal career as a law clerk for fellow Penn Law alumna Judge Norma L. Shapiro of the United States District Court for the Eastern District of Pennsylvania from 1988 to 1989 and also served as an Assistant United States Attorney in the Eastern District of Pennsylvania from 1989 to 1995 and in the District of Massachusetts from 1995 to 2005.
James C. Cacheris: judge on the United States District Court for the Eastern District of Virginia
 A. Richard Caputo, judge, United States District Court for the Eastern District of Pennsylvania
 Tanya S. Chutkan, Penn Law class of 1987, judge, United States District Court for the District of Columbia
 Rudolph Contreras, judge, United States District Court for the District of Columbia.
 James Harry Covington, judge, United States District Court for the District of Columbia; Co-founder of Covington & Burling
James C. Cacheris: judge on the United States District Court for the Eastern District of Virginia
Andre M. Davis: judge for the United States Court of Appeals for the Fourth Circuit (2009– )
Susan J. Dlott: judge for the United States District Court for the Southern District of Ohio (1995– )
 George M. Dallas, judge, U.S. Court of Appeals for the Third Circuit, 1892–1909
 Stewart Dalzell (September 18, 1943 – February 18, 2019), who graduated from the University of Pennsylvania, Wharton School of Business with a Bachelor of Science degree in 1965 and received his Juris Doctor from the University of Pennsylvania Law School in 1969, was a United States district judge of the United States District Court for the Eastern District of Pennsylvania.
Andre M. Davis: judge for the United States Court of Appeals for the Fourth Circuit (2009– )
John Morgan Davis, United States district judge of the United States District Court for the Eastern District of Pennsylvania 1964–84
 John Warren Davis, former United States district judge of the United States District Court for the District of New Jersey and the United States Court of Appeals for the Third Circuit
 Paul S. Diamond, United States district judge of the United States District Court for the Eastern District of Pennsylvania
 John William Ditter Jr., United States district judge of the United States District Court for the Eastern District of Pennsylvania
Susan J. Dlott: judge for the United States District Court for the Southern District of Ohio (1995– )
 Herbert Allan Fogel, United States district judge of the United States District Court for the Eastern District of Pennsylvania, 1973–78
 Ronald M. Gould: judge for the United States Court of Appeals for the Ninth Circuit
James S. Halpern: judge, United States Tax Court (1990–2005)
 James Hunter III, judge, U.S. Court of Appeals for the Third Circuit, 1971–1989
 Daniel Henry Huyett III, United States district judge of the United States District Court for the Eastern District of Pennsylvania, 1970–98
 Abdul Kallon, United States district judge of the United States District Court for the District of Alabama
 Harry Ellis Kalodner, chief judge, U.S. Court of Appeals for the Third Circuit, 1946–1977
 William Huntington Kirkpatrick, United States district judge of the United States District Court for the Eastern District of Pennsylvania 1927–58
 John C. Knox, judge, United States district judge of the United States District Court for the Southern District of New York, 1948–55
 Charles William Kraft Jr., United States district judge of the United States District Court for the Eastern District of Pennsylvania, 1956–2002
Phyllis A. Kravitch: judge on the United States Court of Appeals for the Eleventh Circuit
 Robert Lowe Kunzig, judge, U.S. Court of Claims, 1971–82
 Caleb Rodney Layton III, United States district judge of the United States District Court for the District of Delaware, 1957–88
 Paul Conway Leahy, judge  for the United States District Court for the District of Delaware (1942–66 -judge)(1948–57 -chief judge)
 James Russell Leech, judge, United States Tax Court (1932–52)
Joseph Simon Lord III, United States district judge of the United States District Court for the Eastern District of Pennsylvania, 1961–92; Chief Judge of the United States District Court for the Eastern District of Pennsylvania (1971–82)
Alan David Lourie: judge on the United States Court of Appeals for the Federal Circuit
 Alfred Leopold Luongo, United States district judge of the United States District Court for the Eastern District of Pennsylvania (1961–86); Chief Judge of the United States District Court for the Eastern District of Pennsylvania (1982–86)
 Thomas Ambrose Masterson, judge, United States district judge of the United States District Court for the Eastern District of Pennsylvania, 1967–73
 James Focht McClure Jr., United States district judge of the United States District Court for the Middle District of Pennsylvania
 Barron Patterson McCune, United States district judge of the United States District Court for the Western District of Pennsylvania
Joseph Leo McGlynn Jr., United States district judge of the United States District Court for the Eastern District of Pennsylvania, 1974–99
 Gerald Austin McHugh Jr., United States district judge of the United States District Court for the Eastern District of Pennsylvania, 2014–
 Charles Louis McKeehan, United States district judge of the United States District Court for the Eastern District of Pennsylvania, 1923–25
 Roderick R. McKelvie, United States district judge of the United States District Court for the District of Delaware, 1991–2002
 Mary A. McLaughlin, United States district judge of the United States District Court for the Eastern District of Pennsylvania
 John Bayard McPherson, judge, U.S. Court of Appeals for the Third Circuit, 1912–1919 (Read)
Howard G. Munson: Chief Judge for the United States District Court for the Northern District of New York (1980–88)
John W. Murphy: Judge of the United States District Court for the Middle District of Pennsylvania (1946–62); Chief Judge (for portion of 1945-1962) 
 Thomas Newman O'Neill Jr., United States district judge of the United States District Court for the Eastern District of Pennsylvania
Richard Peters Jr., Class of 1761: Pennsylvania delegate to the Continental Congress, 1782–83; Commissioner for the Board of War for the Continental Army; Speaker of the Pennsylvania House of Representatives; served in the Pennsylvania Senate; appointed by George Washington as judge of the U.S. District Court for the Eastern District of Pennsylvania (1815–1828)
 Gene E. K. Pratter, United States district judge of the United States District Court for the Eastern District of Pennsylvania
 Arthur Raymond Randolph, judge, United States Court of Appeals for the District of Columbia Circuit
 Bruce E. Reinhart, Class of 1987, United States magistrate judge for the Southern District of Florida sworn in on March 14, 2018. Magistrate Judge Reinhart began his legal career as a law clerk for fellow Penn Law graduate Judge Norma L. Shapiro of the United States District Court for the Eastern District of Pennsylvania from 1987 to 1988 and also served as an Assistant United States Attorney 
Marjorie Rendell: judge for the United States District Court for the Eastern District of Pennsylvania (1994–97), and for the United States Court of Appeals for the Third Circuit (1997– )
 L. Felipe Restrepo (Penn College Class of 1981): United States Circuit Judge of the United States Court of Appeals for the Third Circuit (2015 to present) and former United States District Judge of the United States District Court for the Eastern District of Pennsylvania (2006 to 2014).
 Owen J. Roberts, justice, Supreme Court of the United States
 Sue Lewis Robinson, United States district judge of the United States District Court for the District of Delaware
Paul Hitch Roney: chief judge for the United States Court of Appeals for the Eleventh Circuit (1986–89)
 Max Rosenn, judge, U.S. Court of Appeals for the Third Circuit, 1970–2006
 Juan Ramon Sánchez, United States district judge of the United States District Court for the Eastern District of Pennsylvania
 Ralph Francis Scalera, United States district judge of the United States District Court for the Western District of Pennsylvania
 Allen G. Schwartz, United States district judge of the United States District Court for the Southern District of New York, 1993–2003
 Murray Merle Schwartz, Chief United States district judge of the United States District Court for the District of Delaware, 1974–
Murray Merle Schwartz: Chief Judge of the United States District Court for the District of Delaware (1985–89)
 Norma Levy Shapiro, United States district judge of the United States District Court for the Eastern District of Pennsylvania
 Patty Shwartz, Penn Law Class of 1986, judge, United States Court of Appeals for the Third Circuit, assumed office April 10, 2013
 Jerome B. Simandle, United States district judge of the United States District Court for the District of New Jersey
 Dolores Sloviter, judge, United States Court of Appeals for the Third Circuit
 Jonathan R. Steinberg: former judge for the United States Court of Appeals for Veterans Claims
 Charles Swayne, judge, United States district judge of the United States District Court for the Northern District of Florida, 1890–1907
 Joseph Whitaker Thompson, judge, United States Court of Appeals for the Third Circuit (1931–46)
 Donald West VanArtsdalen, United States district judge of the United States District Court for the Eastern District of Pennsylvania 1970–19 85
 Jay Waldman, United States district judge of the United States District Court for the Eastern District of Pennsylvania1988–2003
 Henry Galbraith Ward, judge, U.S. United States Court of Appeals for the Second Circuit (1907–24)
 Gerald Joseph Weber,(Penn Law Class of 1939), senior judge, chief judge, and judge, United States District Court for the Western District of Pennsylvania (1964–1988) (Chief Judge 1976 – 1982)
 Helene White, judge, U.S. Court of Appeals for the Sixth Circuit
 Scott Wilson: judge on the United States Court of Appeals for the First Circuit (1929–43)
 Harold Kenneth Wood, United States district judge of the United States District Court for the Eastern District of Pennsylvania 1959–1971

State Attorneys General
As of January of 2023 there are at least 20 Penn Alumni who have been attorneys general in 5 states and District of Columbia

Other state or local executive or judicial branch officials

Foreign governments

Heads of state and government

Mayors
Wayne Chiang Wan-an (Penn Law LLM Class of 2004, JD Class of 2006), as of December of 2022, the 24th Mayor of Taipei, capital of Republic of China
Ron Huldai: mayor of Tel Aviv (1998–)
Raul Roco: former presidential candidate and Secretary of Education in the Philippines
Mauricio Rodas: Mayor of Quito (2014–)

Members of Congress or Parliament
Douglas Alexander: British member of Parliament, and Secretary of State for International Development
David Campbell Bannerman: member of the European Parliament for East of England (2009– )
Suchan Chae: former member of the National Assembly of Korea
Aziz Dweik: speaker of the Palestinian National Authority
John Wallace de Beque Farris: Canadian politician and member of the Senate of Canada (1937–70) and Attorney General of Vancouver (1917–20)
George Hollingbery: British Member of parliament (MP) (2010– )
Edward Jenkin: Liberal Party Member of Parliament in Great Britain; Agent-General of Canada
Bongbong Marcos: senator from the Philippines
Simón Gaviria Muñoz: president of the Chamber of Representatives of Colombia (2011– )
Lindsay Northover, Baroness Northover: British politician in the House of Lords
Philip Norton, Baron Norton of Louth: British member of the House of Lords (1998– )
Douglas Peters: member of the Canadian Parliament (1993–97)
Sachin Pilot: Member of Parliament (2004–2014) from the Indian National Congress party
Mar Roxas: senator of the Philippines (2004– )
Ashwini Vaishnaw (Wharton MBA Class of 2010), a member of Bharatiya Janata Party elected to be in Parliament of India representing Odisha State in the Rajya Sabha, the upper house in June of 2019 
His Excellency Umar Ahmad Ghuman (College Class of 1996) Former Federal Minister of State for Investment and Privatization 2002-2007, chairman Board of Investment, Member of Parliament of Pakistan from Sialkot, Pakistan

Other foreign officials

Lawyers, advisors, and civil rights leaders

Medicine

As is detailed below, Penn Med has four alumni who were awarded a Nobel Prize in Physiology or Medicine

 Ephraim Leister Acker (1827–1903) earned his M.D., (Penn Med class of 1852) and LL.B., (Penn Law class of 1886), served as Pennsylvania representative to the US Congress, 1871–1873
 Robert Adams Jr.: (1849-1906) class of 1869: member of St. Anthony Hall, studied law under preceptor George W. Biddle (and admitted to the bar in 1872 but never practiced law), served as member of the United States Geological Survey during the explorations of Yellowstone National Park; served in Pennsylvania State Senate was appointed United States Minister to Brazil was elected to Congress a vacancy and then served three terms as representative from the 2nd Pennsylvania district
Pete Allen (1868–1946) Penn Med class of 1897, played one game in Major League Baseball for the Cleveland Spiders, specialized in proctology and was a member of the American Proctology Society, the American Medical Association and the Philadelphia County Medical Society, taught as an assistant professor of proctology at Jefferson Medical College
 Charles Conrad Abbott, Penn Med class of 1865 served as surgeon in Union Army during American Civil War and in 1876 discovered traces of human presence in the Delaware River Valley dating from the first or "Kansan" ice age, and inferentially from the pre-glacial period when humans are believed to have entered upon the North American continent 
David Hayes Agnew (November 24, 1818 – March 22, 1892) Penn Med class of 1838 volunteered as consulting and operating surgeon when President James A. Garfield was fatally wounded by an assassin's bullet in 1881 and wrote The Principles and Practice of Surgery based on his experience of fifty active years, of practicing medicine which was a three-volume set published 1878–1883
William Wallace Anderson: Penn Med class of 1849: designed the Borough House Plantation and Church of the Holy Cross (Stateburg, South Carolina), now National Historic Landmarks 
 John Archer, Penn Med class of 1768: first person to receive a medical degree from an American medical school and a US congressman from Maryland
John Light Atlee (1799–1885) Penn Med class of 1820: an American physician and surgeon who helped found Lancaster County Association of Physicians, organize the American Medical Association and served as its president, and was appointed professor of anatomy at Franklin and Marshall College
 William Maclay Awl, (May 24, 1799 – November 19, 1876) Penn Med class of 1824 (did not graduate): acting superintendent of the Ohio "State Hospital," president of the Association of Superintendents of Asylums for the Insane of the United States and Canada, one of the founders of the Ohio State Medical Society
 Lewis Heisler Ball (September 21, 1861 – October 18, 1932), Penn Med class of 1885 elected state treasurer of Delaware and to the US House of Representatives; appointed to US Senate for Delaware, later elected to Senate in the second popular election of a Senator in Delaware
 William P. C. Barton, (November 17, 1786 – March 27, 1856) Penn Med class of 1808: author of A Treatise Containing a Plan for the Internal Organization and Government of Marine Hospitals in the U.S.... and Dean of Jefferson Medical College
 (Mary) Alice Bennett (January 31, 1851 – 1925): physician; first woman to obtain a Ph.D. from the University of Pennsylvania (1880); first woman in Pennsylvania to direct a female division in a mental institution
John Milton Bernhisel:(1799–1881) Penn Med class of 1827, began practicing medicine in New York City but after became affiliated with the Latter Day Saint movement and moved to Nauvoo, Illinois, where he served as the personal physician to Joseph Smith, and living in Smith's home and delivering some of his children, followed Brigham Young west with the majority of the Latter-day Saints to Salt Lake City, Utah Territory, represented the Latter-day Saints before Congress to advocate for statehood as the State of Deseret, served in Congress, regent of the University of Utah, member of the Council of Fifty
 William Wyatt Bibb (October 2, 1781 – July 10, 1820) Penn Med class of 1801: served one term in Georgia House of Representatives, was elected to United States Congress to fill a vacancy (an office to which he was reelected four times), was elected by the state legislature to the United States Senate to fill a vacancy, last governor of the Alabama Territory and first elected governor of Alabama
Karin J. Blakemore: Penn College for Women class of 1974, leading medical geneticist and professor at Johns Hopkins School of Medicine, where she was director of Chorionic Villus Sampling Program and Laboratory, Alphafetoprotein (AFP) Referral Service, Prenatal Diagnostic Center, and Maternal-Fetal Medicine and that division's fellowship program; led team at the Johns Hopkins University's Institute of Genetic Medicine
 Leonard N. Boston: Medico-Chirurgical College of Philadelphia (merged into University of Pennsylvania School of Medicine) Class of 1896, appointed Penn Med professor of physical diagnosis in 1912, and then associate professor of medicine in 1919, served as professor at the Women's Medical College of Pennsylvania (now part of Drexel University College of Medicine) in 1928
 Allan G. Brodie, DDS (1897–1976) University of Pennsylvania School of Dental Medicine (Penn Dental) class of 1919: dentist and orthodonist, teacher, writer, and researcher who, in 1929, was invited by Dean Frederick Bogue Noyes to the University of Illinois College of Dentistry to organize its Department of Orthodontics, one of the first graduate orthodontics departments established in the United States
Michael S. Brown (born April 13, 1941) Penn Med class of 1965, won the Nobel Prize in Physiology or Medicine in 1985 for describing the regulation of cholesterol metabolism and is also the 1985 recipient of the Albert Lasker Award for Basic Medical Research
 Hiram R. Burton (1841–1927) Penn Med class of 1868: elected to the US House of Representatives (for Delaware's at-large district) twice and served in Congress from March 4, 1905, until March 3, 1909; also served as Delaware secretary of state
Doc Bushong, DDS, Penn Dental class of 1882: first graduate from any school at Penn to play in Major League Baseball and since he played professional baseball during his time at Penn Dental he could not play for Penn
 Tom Cahill, Penn Med class of 1893 but left in 1891: played one season in Major League Baseball for the Louisville Colonels, died from an injury before finishing medical degree
 Charles Caldwell, Penn Med class of 1796: founder of the University of Louisville School of Medicine
John Carson: College Class of 1771, Original Trustee, rechartered University of Pennsylvania, and original incorporator and Fellow of The College of Physicians of Philadelphia
 Samuel A. Cartwright, Penn Med alumnus from the 1810s who did not graduate: improved sanitary conditions during the American Civil War and was honored for his investigations into yellow fever and Asiatic cholera but criticised for unscientific creation of diseases affecting enslaved and free blacks
 Henry H. Chambers, Penn Med class of 1811: US senator from Alabama
Nathaniel Chapman: (1780 –1853) Penn Med class of 1800: physician who was the founding president of the American Medical Association in 1847, founded the American Journal of the Medical Sciences in 1820 where he served as its editor for number of years, and also served as president of both the Philadelphia County Medical Society and the American Philosophical Society
 John Claiborne, Penn Med class of 1798: Virginia representative to Congress
 Lewis Condict, Penn Med class of 1794:  New Jersey representative to Congress, trustee of Princeton College
 Samuel W. Crawford, Penn Med class of 1850: US Army surgeon and a Union general in the American Civil War
William Holmes Crosby Jr. (1914–2005) Penn College class of 1936 and Penn Med class of 1940: a founding father of modern hematology; published more than 450 peer-reviewed papers in hematology, oncology, gastroenterology, iron metabolism, nutrition, and general medical practice; established in 1951 and was chief of the hematology and oncology specialties at Walter Reed Army Hospital until 1965; inventor of Crosby–Kugler capsule; published translator of poetry.
 William Darlington, Penn Med class of 1804: War of 1812 major of a volunteer regiment, Pennsylvania representative to Congress
 William Potts Dewees, Penn Med class of 1806: Obstetrician and author of System of Midwifery, a standard reference book on Obstetrics
Samuel Gibson Dixon: (March 23, 1851 – February 26, 1918) Penn Law class of 1877 and Penn Med class of 1886; also studied bacteriology at King's College London, and at Pettenkoffer's Laboratory of Hygiene in Munich before returning to Penn Med as the professor of hygiene; commissioner of the State Department of Health in Pennsylvania from 1905 until his death in 1918, during which time he worked for the prevention of tuberculosis and similar diseases by introducing sanitary and hygienic reforms that set new standards for government public health programs that saved thousands of lives
Pliny Earle, class of 1837: physician, psychiatrist, poet; a founder of the American Medical Association, the New York Academy of Medicine, the Association of Medical Superintendents of American Institutions for the Insane, and the New England Psychological Society
Gerald Edelman: (July 1, 1929 – May 17, 2014) Penn Med class of 1954, an American biologist who shared the 1972 Nobel Prize in Physiology or Medicine for work on the immune system via research resulting in discovery of the structure of antibody molecules and was founder and director of The Neurosciences Institute
Archibald Magill Fauntleroy: surgeon in the Confederate Army
 Clement Finley, Penn Med class of 1818: 10th surgeon general of the United States Army
 John Floyd, Penn Med class of 1804: 25th governor of Virginia, Virginia representative to Congress
Walter Freeman: Penn Med class of 1920; lobotomist who performed nearly 3500 lobotomies in 23 states; first neurologist in Washington, D.C.
A.Y.P. Garnett (1820–1888), Penn Med class of 1842: served as president of the American Medical Association and served Jefferson Davis and as physician to Robert E. Lee during the American Civil War
Donald Guthrie (1880–1958), Penn Med class of 1905, surgeon best known for establishing Guthrie Clinic in Sayre, Pennsylvania, in 1910, one of the earliest multi-specialty group medical practices, which Guthrie based on the principles he learned while a surgical resident (1906–1909) at Mayo Clinic, in Rochester, Minnesota
 John Hahn (October 30, 1776 – February 26, 1823) Penn Med class of 1798 elected to the Fourteenth Congress as a member of the U.S. House of Representatives for Pennsylvania's 2nd congressional district from 1815 to 1817
Isaac Hays: Penn College class of 1816 and Penn Med class of 1822 ophthalmologist; first treasurer and founding member of Board of the American Medical Association and editor for over fifty (50) years of American Journal of the Medical Sciences
 David Jackson, Penn Med class of 1768: appointed to manage the lottery for costs of the American Revolutionary War, but he resigned to become an army surgeon, Pennsylvania delegate to the Continental Congress in 1785 and 1786
 Joseph Jorgensen, Penn Med class of 1865: Virginia representative to Congress
Myint Myint Khin, MD, (December 15, 1923 – June 19, 2014) an English major at the University of Rangoon, she ultimately graduated from Penn Med with class of 1955, and also did her residency at University of Pennsylvania, married (in 1953) to San Baw, a medical school classmate who received an MD and an MS from Penn Med, served as chair of the Department of Medicine of the Institute of Medicine, Mandalay from 1965 to 1984, and served as a consultant at the World Health Organization from 1985 to 1991, published eleven books in Burmese and two in English
Albert Kligman, Ph.D., M.D.: University of Pennsylvania School of Arts and Sciences class of 1942 and Penn Med class of 1947; botanist and dermatologist who invented Retin-A, a popular acne medication
 Emily Kramer-Golinkoff, MBE, 2009: researcher, health activist, and cystic-fibrosis patient, founder of nonprofit Emily's Entourage
David E. Kuhl: developer of positron emission tomography, also known as PET scanning, a nuclear medicine imaging technique
 Andrew Lam, Penn Med class of 2002: author and retinal surgeon
 Caleb R. Layton, Penn Med class of 1876: Delaware representative to Congress
Crawford Long, Penn Med class of 1839: surgeon and pharmacist, namesake of Emory University-operated Crawford Long Hospital
 George McClellan, class of 1819: founder of Jefferson Medical College, now Thomas Jefferson University
 Willoughby D. Miller (1853–1907) Penn Dental class of 1879 (first class to graduate) was an American dentist and the first oral microbiologist. and was appointed dean of the University of Michigan School of Dentistry in 1906, but died in 1907, prior to assuming the position
 George Edward Mitchell, Penn Med class of 1805: Maryland representative to Congress
Charles Delucena Meigs: pioneering leader in obstetrics
John Peter Mettauer: first plastic surgeon in the US
 Leo C. Mundy, Penn Med class of 1908, (1887–1944) physician and politician who served as a member of the Pennsylvania Senate for the 21st district and who served in the United States Army during World War I where he was placed in charge of a one-thousand-bed military hospital in France and received the distinguished service citation from General John Pershing for heroism in treating and evacuating wounded soldiers under fire
Reuben D. Mussey: Penn Med class of 1809 wrote the first definitive history of tobacco documenting its dangers (1835); president of the American Medical Association
 Arnold Naudain, Penn Med class of 1810: served in the War of 1812 as surgeon of the Delaware Regiment, US senator from Delaware
 Arthur Percy Noyes (1880–1963), Penn Med class of 1906, served as superintendent of the Rhode Island state mental hospital and the Norristown, Pennsylvania, state mental hospital where he creating a psychiatric residency training programs for Penn Med, which lasted for over fifty years, and writing a seminal textbook, A Textbook on Psychiatry for Students and Graduates in Schools of Nursing which led to publication of his textbook Modern Clinical Psychiatry, served as president of the Philadelphia Psychiatric Society, Pennsylvania Psychiatric Society, and American Psychiatric Association
 Archibald E. Olpp (May 12, 1882 – July 26, 1949), Penn Med class of 1908: physician and politician who was an instructor in chemistry at Lehigh University and in biological chemistry at the Columbia University College of Physicians and Surgeons; served as first lieutenant in the United States Medical Corps during the World War I; first Republican to be elected to Congress from the New Jersey's 11th congressional district since it was created in 1913
 John H. Outland, Penn Med class of 1899 (after starting at University of Kansas); became one of the few men ever to win All-American football honors as both lineman and the backfield player; voted "Most Popular Man" in the entire University of Pennsylvania
Mehmet Oz: surgeon, author and TV host
 John M. Patton, Penn Med class of 1818: Virginia representative to Congress
 William Pepper (August 21, 1843July 28, 1898), Penn Med class of 1864: lectured on morbid anatomy and clinical medicine and as professor at Penn and succeeded Dr. Alfred Still as professor of theory and practice of medicine; founded and editor of the Philadelphia Medical Times; elected provost of the University of Pennsylvania in 1881 and remained in that position until 1894; medical director of the United States Centennial Exhibition at Philadelphia in 1876; made Knight Commander of Saint Olaf by King Oscar II of Sweden.; founder of Philadelphia's first free public library
Sidney Pestka: biochemist and geneticist; the "father of interferon"
Philip Syng Physick, class of 1785: surgeon in post-colonial America; called "the father of American surgery"
Stanley B. Prusiner: (born May 28, 1942) Penn College class of 1964 and Penn Med class of 1968: neurologist and biochemist who discovered prions, a class of infectious self-reproducing pathogens primarily or solely composed of protein resulting in him being awarded the Albert Lasker Award for Basic Medical Research in 1994 and the Nobel Prize in Physiology or Medicine in 1997 for prion research developed by him and his team of experts
 John H. Pugh, Penn Med class of 1852: New Jersey representative to Congress
 David Ramsay, Penn Med class of 1773, 1780 (Hon. M.D.): South Carolina delegate to the Continental Congress, one of the first major historians of the American Revolution
Howard A. Rusk: founder of the Rusk Institute of Rehabilitation Medicine at NYU Langone Medical Center; "father of comprehensive rehabilitation"
 Jacob A. Salzmann (1901–1992) Penn Dental class of 1922: orthodontist known for developing an assessment index for determining malocclusion, which has been adopted by American Dental Association Council of Dental Health, the Council on Dental Care Programs, and by the American Association of Orthodontists
Sandra Saouaf: earned her PhD from Penn in immunology
Valentine Seaman:  physician who introduced the small pox vaccine to the US
Gregg Semenza: (born July 12, 1956), Penn Med class of 1982: professor of genetic medicine at the Johns Hopkins School of Medicine, where he is director of the vascular program at the Institute for Cell Engineering, is a 2016 recipient of the Albert Lasker Award for Basic Medical Research, is known for his discovery of HIF-1, which allows cancer cells to adapt to oxygen-poor environments, and shared the 2019 Nobel Prize in Physiology or Medicine for "discoveries of how cells sense and adapt to oxygen availability"
 Adam Seybert, Penn Med class of 1793: Pennsylvania representative to Congress
 Rajiv Shah, Penn Med class of 2001: former director of USAID, formerly at Bill and Melinda Gates Foundation; also alumnus of the Wharton School; president, Rockefeller Foundation
Thomas Smith: (University of Pennsylvania Medical School Class of 1829) who, after obtaining his medical degree, was hired as a surgeon on a merchant vessel that traveled to trade in several East Asian ports and spent nearly ten years in China and learned to speak Chinese. and later became a Justice of the Indiana Supreme Court (January 29, 1847 through January 3, 1853)
Isaac Starr: Isaac "Jack" Starr (1895 –1989) Penn Med class of 1920, interned at Massachusetts General Hospital, appointed Penn Med's first assistant professor in pharmacology, first Hartzell Professor of Research Therapeutics, and dean from 1945 to 1948, known as the father of ballistocardiography, and awarded the Albert Lasker Award of the American Heart Association "for fundamental contributions to knowledge of the heart and the circulation, and for his development of the first practical ballistocardiograph",  Kober Medal of the Association of American Physicians, the Burger Medal of the Free University of Amsterdam, and an honorary Doctor of Science (Sc.D.) degree from University of Pennsylvania for his contributions to medicine
Alexander Hodgdon Stevens: second President of the American Medical Association
Alfred Stillé: the first Secretary, and later president of the American Medical Association
 Joel Barlow Sutherland, Penn Med class of 1812: Pennsylvania representative to Congress, served in the War of 1812 as assistant surgeon to the "Junior Artillerists of Philadelphia"
 Wendy Sue Swanson, Penn Med class of 2003: pediatrician, social media activist, author of Seattle Mama Doc blog
 Hedge Thompson, Penn Med class of 1802: New Jersey representative to the Congress
Samuel Hollingsworth Stout, Penn Med class of 1848: Confederate surgeon, teacher, slaveholder, farmer
Edward Bright Vedder: US Army physician and noted researcher of beriberi
Bert Vogelstein: cancer researcher at Johns Hopkins University
 William Carlos Williams, Penn Med class of 1906, poet, pediatrician, and general practitioner
 Caspar Wistar, Penn Med class of 1782: president of the American Philosophical Society and president of the Society for the Abolition of Slavery
 George Bacon Wood, Penn Med class of 1818: Compiled first Dispensatory of the United States (1833); president of both the College of Physicians of Philadelphia and American Medical Association
 , Penn Med class of 1862: author of the 1874 work Treatise on Therapeutics, Special Prize from American Philosophical Society for his 1869 paper Research upon American Hemp, 1871 Warren Prize from Massachusetts General Hospital for Experimental Researches in the Physiological Action of Amyl Nitrite, 1872 Boylston Prize for Thermic Fever or Sunstroke, nephew of George Bacon Wood
 Joseph Janvier Woodward,(1833–1884), (commonly known as J. J. Woodward) Penn Med class of 1853): served as 34th president of the American Medical Association; pioneer in photomicrography, surgeon; performed the autopsies of Abraham Lincoln and John Wilkes Booth; attended to president James A. Garfield after he was shot

Military

Medal of Honor recipients 
William R. D. Blackwood (May 12, 1838 – April 26, 1922) University of Pennsylvania School of Medicine Class of 1862: Medal of Honor recipient from the American Civil War
Cecil Clay (February 13, 1842 – September 23, 1903) University of Pennsylvania Class of 1864; joined fraternity St. Anthony Hall; Medal of Honor recipient and brevet brigadier general from the American Civil War
Joseph K. Corson (November 22, 1836– July 24, 1913)) University of Pennsylvania School of Medicine Class of 1863: Medal of Honor recipient from the American Civil War
Henry A. du Pont (July 30, 1838 – December 31, 1926): Medal of Honor recipient and lieutenant colonel from the American Civil War and elected twice by Delaware Assembly to United States Senate
Frederick C. Murphy (July 27, 1918 – March 19, 1945) University of Pennsylvania Class of 1943: Medal of Honor recipient from World War II who attended Penn before enlisting in the United States Army

Air Force officials 
Harris Hull (May 23, 1909 – January 29, 1993) Wharton School of Business and Finance: Class of 1930  B.S. in Economics, decorated brigadier general of the United States Air Force (USAF) during World War II 
George G. Lundberg (October 19, 1892 – January 1981) Wharton School of Business and Finance: Class of 1917 B.S. in Economics: appointed Brigadier general of the USAF during World War II
David G. Young III, MD, (College class of 1971, BA in Biology): United States Air Force brigadier general

Army officials

Coast Guard officials 
William Augustus Newell, Class of 1839: a father of the modern-day United States Coast Guard; created the United States Life-Saving Service through the Newell Act, which merged with the Revenue Cutter Service to form the Coast Guard in 1915

Marine Corps officials 
William P. Biddle: (Class of 1875 and member of Delta Psi fraternity AKA St. Anthony Hall) Major general and the 11th commandant of the United States Marine Corps
George R. Christmas: (Class of 1962, B.A) retired USMC lieutenant general, and president and CEO of the Marine Corps Heritage Foundation
Robert L. Denig: (class of 1907, did not graduate) highly decorated (during World War 1) brigadier general in the USMC, who served as its first director of public information during World War 2.
John Marston (USMC): Major general during WWII
Samuel Nicholas: (Academy and College of Philadelphia Class of 1759) founder and first commandant of the USMC, commissioned in 1775

Merchant Marine officials 
James A. Helis University of Pennsylvania School of Arts and Sciences, Master of Arts in political science: rear admiral and the 12th superintendent of the United States Merchant Marine Academy, 2012–2018
Ted Weems: bandleader for the US Merchant Marine during World War II

Navy officials 
Kenneth Braithwaite: University of Pennsylvania, Fels Institute of Government (Class of 1995, master's degree in government administration) a retired United States Navy one-star rear admiral. who as of December 7, 2020 is serving as the 77th secretary of the Navy since May 29, 2020. as he was nominated by President Donald Trump on March 2, 2020, and was sworn in on May 29, 2020 and previously served as United States Ambassador to Norway under President Donald J. Trump
Peter Burleigh: US ambassador to the United Nations, the Philippines, Palau, the Maldives, and Sri Lanka; attended graduate school but did not earn a degree
Stephen Decatur: American commodore noted for his heroism during the First Barbary War and the War of 1812, he was the youngest man ever to attain the rank of captain in the United States Navy (USN); namesake of many communities and counties in the US
Nancy J. Lescavage: Rear Admiral and 20th Director of the Navy Nurse Corps
Mary Joan Nielubowicz: Director of the Navy Nurse Corps, 1983–87
William Ruschenberger: Surgeon for the USN and president of the Academy of Natural Sciences of Philadelphia 1870–1882, and president of the College of Physicians of Philadelphia 1879–1883
Richard Somers: Naval officer and namesake of Somers, New York, and Somers Point, New Jersey
James A. Zimble: 30th surgeon general of the USN

Philosophy, theology, and religion

Science and technology

Other

Notorious

Fictional alumni

Nobel laureates

Physics

Chemistry

Medicine

Economics

See also 

 List of companies founded by University of Pennsylvania alumni
 List of Wharton School alumni

References

Bibliography
 

Lists of people by university or college in Pennsylvania

Philadelphia-related lists